The 2009 Men's Hockey Champions Challenge II. The inaugural tournament saw eight teams compete. It was held from July 6 to July 12, 2009, in Dublin, Ireland, with Poland winning the title.

Teams
Eight teams competed in this tournament, based on ranking in the qualifying tournaments for 2008 Summer Olympics, they were:

 (Second)
 (Third)
 (Third)
 (Third)
 (Fourth)
 (Fourth)
 (Fourth)
 (Fifth)

Results
All times are Irish Standard Time (UTC+1)

First round

Pool A

Pool B

Fifth to eighth place classification

Crossover

Seventh and eighth place

Fifth and sixth place

First to fourth place classification

Semifinals

Third and fourth place

Final

Awards

Statistics

Final ranking

References

2009
Champions Challenge II
Hockey Champions Challenge II Men
International field hockey competitions hosted by Ireland
International sports competitions in Dublin (city)
2000s in Dublin (city)
Hockey Champions Challenge II Men